al-Zawahiri (aẓ-Ẓawāhirī) is an Arabic surname or nisbah derived from name of the town of Zawahir, Saudi Arabia. The definite article "al-" is sometimes omitted. Alternate spellings include Dhawahiri, Dhawahri, and Zawahri.

List of people with the surname
 Ayman al-Zawahiri (1951-2022), Egyptian al-Qaeda leader
 Hussein al-Zawahiri, Egyptian terror suspect captured and handed over to Egypt, younger brother of Ayman al-Zawahiri
 Muhammad al-Zawahiri (born 1953), terror suspect living in Egypt, Ayman al-Zawahiri's younger brother
 John Zawahri, the perpetrator of the 2013 Santa Monica shooting

See also
 Al-Zahrawi 10th century Arab Andalusian surgeon, physician, chemist, Latinized as Abulcasis

References

Arabic-language surnames
Toponymic surnames
Nisbas
People from Mecca Province